Ethmia berndkerni is a moth in the family Depressariidae. It is found in Costa Rica, where it has been recorded from the foothills of the Cordillera de Guanacaste (at altitudes between ), the northern Caribbean lowlands (at about ), in the Cordillera Volcánica Central (at altitudes between ) and at the Península de Osa (at about ). The habitat consists of rain forests.

The ground color of the forewings is light brown with indistinct dark brown/black elongated markings and a defined big spot at the costa before the apex. The posterior half of the base has no markings. The terminal line is composed of eight blackish dots from before the costa to the tornus. The hindwing ground colour is light brown, becoming darker at the apex.

The larvae feed on Bourreria costaricensis.

Etymology
The species is named in honor of Bernd Kern for his support of Eternal Children's Rainforest of Monteverde, Costa Rica; Children's Rainforest Sweden; and Área de Conservación Guanacaste.

References

Moths described in 2014
berndkerni